Gucheng is a town of northern Huanren Manchu Autonomous County, eastern Liaoning province in Northeast China. It lies near the border with Jilin province, in a mountainous region of the province. China National Highway 201 (G201) passes through the area.

External links
Government of Gucheng

Township-level divisions of Liaoning